Shitab Rural District is a rural district (dehestan) in Mugarmun District, Landeh County, Kohgiluyeh and Boyer-Ahmad Province, Iran. At the 2006 census, its population was 430, in 76 families. The rural district was established in 2012. The rural district has 1 village.

References 

Rural Districts of Kohgiluyeh and Boyer-Ahmad Province
Landeh County
2012 establishments in Iran